Robot 17 (Robotsystem 17) is a Swedish anti-ship missile based on the American AGM-114C Hellfire, further developed by Bofors to work against sea targets and be transported and fired on land.

The system is used by Swedish Amphibious Corps (Amfibiekåren), which uses high-speed boats to transport it between land and islands, after which disembarked soldiers can then quickly position the system and make it ready to fire.  By creating a moving and unpredictable threat from anti-ship missiles along the Swedish coast, the Swedish Armed Forces hopes to be able to "make it more difficult for an opponent to enter ships in the Swedish archipelago or ports".

In June 2022, Sweden publicly stated their intent to assist Ukraine against Russia's invasion of Ukraine by sending a number of Robot 17. In October 2022, evidence appeared on social media suggesting that Ukrainian Ground Forces had started using the weapons in an ad-hoc land attack role.

References 

Anti-ship missiles